Ottó Komoly (also known as Nathan Kohn) (26 March 1892 – 1 January 1945)  was a Hungarian Jewish engineer, officer, Zionist, and humanitarian leader in Hungary. He is credited with saving thousands of children during the German occupation of Budapest in World War II.

Early career 

Educated as an engineer, Komoly was drafted in the Hungarian Army in World War I. He obtained the rank of Lieutenant, was injured in action and subsequently decorated. After the war, his military honors gave him credibility and a high status in the Hungarian society. Thus, he was excluded from most of the prosecution that other Jews suffered in the buildup to World War II.

His family was considering emigration to Palestine in 1939, but he decided to stay in Hungary to help local Jews escape persecution by using his status and influence.

Political and Rescue activities 

Komoly became the Chairman of the Zionist Federation in Hungary, where his father was previously the chairman.

Together with Rudolf Kasztner he created the Aid and Rescue Committee, which provided assistance to Jews fleeing prosecution in Poland and Hungary.

After Germany invaded Hungary in March 1944, Komoly became the head of the International Red Cross department in charge of helping Jewish children. With the help of the embassies of Switzerland and other neutral countries, the Red Cross created 35 refuges for orphaned children (mostly Jewish), where about 6000 children and 600 volunteers working there were ultimately saved from deportation and possible extermination.

On the political front, Komoly activated for the neutrality of Hungary in the war. He tried to influence the government using his military status and his connection with the son of Miklós Horthy. Under his leadership, the Aid and Rescue Committee organized non-Jewish protests against Nazi policies in Hungary, especially among the clergy and politicians.
 
On 1 January 1945, just before the arrival of the Soviet army in Budapest, Arrow Cross militia picked him up from his house. Nothing else is known about him, and it is assumed that he was murdered by the authorities.

Legacy 
The B'nai B'rith World Center in Jerusalem and KKL-JNF held a ceremony, at its Martyr's Forest Scroll of Fire Plaza, on 8 April 2013 - Holocaust Martyrs and Heroes Remembrance Day - to commemorate the rescue activities of Ottó Komoly, president of the Zionist Federation in Hungary during the Holocaust, as chairman of the Hungarian Jewish community's clandestine Assistance and Rescue Committee and later also director of the International Red Cross "Department A" responsible for rescuing Jewish children. Komoly oversaw the rescue of 5,000 Jewish children through the establishment of 52 shelters.

In his honor, a moshav in southern Israel - Yad Natan, is named after him. A number of towns in Israel have streets named after him.

Komoly Ottó received posthumously an award from the Hungarian government for his activities.

References 

1945 deaths
Hungarian Jews
Jewish resistance members during the Holocaust
1892 births
Blood for goods
Hungarian civilians killed in World War II
Resistance members killed by Nazi Germany
Hungarian resistance members
Austro-Hungarian military personnel of World War I